Pipas may refer to:
The plural of pipa, a Chinese stringed instrument
A Mediterranean surname, also spelled Bibas
James Pipas, American virologist
Pipas Bay, a bay in Angola

See also
Pipa (disambiguation)